Mirko Pavlović (born April 21, 1971) is a Serbian professional basketball executive and former player. He currently serves as the sports director for Dynamic Belgrade and a director of the Ranko Žeravica Sports Hall. He played college basketball for the Southern Illinois Salukis.

Early life 
Pavlović was born in Belgrade, Yugoslavia, to Tihomir and Olga Pavlović. His father was a basketball player who played for Crvena zvezda during 1960s and early 1970s.

College career 
Pavlović played college basketball for Southern Illinois Salukis from 1990 to 1994. He appeared in all 29 games in his senior season, 1993–94, season and averaged 11.8 points, 4.4 rebounds and 2.3 assists per game.

Professional career 
Pavlović grew up with the Crvena zvezda Juniors. He began his professional career with the Zvezda in the 1989–90 season. In 1990, Pavlović moved to the United States to play college basketball for the Southern Illinois Salukis.

After going undrafted in the 1994 NBA draft, Pavlović moved back to Belgrade and signed with Crvena zvezda for three more seasons. He was the team captain in the 1996–97 season.

National team career 
Pavlović was a member of the Yugoslavia national cadets team that won the gold medal at the 1987 European Championship for Cadets in Hungary. Over six tournament games, he averaged 3.0 points per game. Pavlović was a member of the Yugoslavia national junior team that won the gold medal at the 1988 FIBA Europe Under-18 Championship in Yugoslavia. Over three tournament games, he averaged 4.3 points per game. Also, he was a team member of the Junior team that finished 5th at the 1990 FIBA Europe Under-18 Championship in the Netherlands. Over three tournament games, Pavlović averaged 8.0 points per game.

Basketball executive career

Crvena zvezda (2002–2017) 
In February 2002, Pavlović was named as the coordinator of the youth teams for Crvena zvezda. In August 2007, he got promoted to the deputy sports director. Also, he was a team manager from August 2007 to December 2008.

In March 2010, Pavlović became a general manager for Crvena zvezda. In October 2015, Davor Ristović succeeded him on that position, while he was named as a sports director. In August 2017, Pavlović left the sports director post.

Olimpija Ljubljana 
In November 2018, Pavlović was named as an assistant of general manager and senior advisor of basketball operations for Slovenian team Petrol Olimpija. He parted ways with Olimpija in March 2019.

Dynamic Belgrade 
On May 29, 2019, Pavlović was named as a sports director for Serbian team Dynamic Belgrade.

See also
 List of father-and-son combinations who have played for Crvena zvezda
 List of KK Crvena zvezda players with 100 games played
 List of European basketball players in the United States

References

External links
 
 Player profile at eurobasket.com

1971 births
Living people
Basketball players from Belgrade
KK Crvena Zvezda executives
KK Crvena zvezda players
Power forwards (basketball)
Serbian basketball executives and administrators
Serbian expatriate basketball people in Slovenia
Serbian expatriate basketball people in the United States
Serbian men's basketball players
Southern Illinois Salukis men's basketball players